Santurio is a parish of the municipality of Gijón / Xixón, in Asturias, Spain.

Its population was 265 in 2012.

Santurio is a residential and rural area, bordering with the districts of Deva in the east and Castiello Bernueces in the west.

Villages and their neighbourhoods
L'Aldea
Los Erones
Les Peñes
Rozaes
Carceo
Les Cañaveres
La Cuesta

External links
 Official Toponyms - Principality of Asturias website.
 Official Toponyms: Laws - BOPA Nº 229 - Martes, 3 de octubre de 2006 & DECRETO 105/2006, de 20 de septiembre, por el que se determinan los topónimos oficiales del concejo de Gijón.

Parishes in Gijón